A by-election was held in the Northland electorate on 28 March 2015. The seat had been vacated following the resignation of Mike Sabin of the National Party from the House of Representatives on 30 January 2015. The election was won by Winston Peters of New Zealand First. As Peters was already a list MP for his party, this allowed New Zealand First an additional list member, Ria Bond, to join parliament.

Background 
In December 2014 New Zealand media reported that Northland MP Mike Sabin was under investigation by police over an assault complaint. The reports were not confirmed by the New Zealand Police, the Prime Minister or Sabin himself.

Sabin resigned from parliament on 30 January 2015 with immediate effect "due to personal issues that were best dealt with outside Parliament."

Northland electorate
The boundaries of the Northland electorate are largely determined by the Northland coastline. The electorate extends from a line between Leigh on the east coast and the Kaipara Harbour on the west coast (including Wellsford) to Cape Reinga, but excludes Whangarei and environs. The major communities include Kaitaia, Russell, Kerikeri, Kaikohe, Dargaville and Mangawhai Heads.

The Northland electorate experienced low population growth between the censuses in 2006 and 2013 (1.2%). Among general electorates Northland had the second-largest proportion of those from the Māori ethnic group (37.1%), as well as those who could speak Māori (10.4%). It had the highest share of: those who worked from home on census day 2013 (18.1%); those affiliated with the Ratana (Māori Christian) faith (4.7%); those affiliated with the Brethren religion (1.3%). Among general electorates in 2013, Northland had the second-lowest median family income ($51,400), and the lowest proportion of wage and salary workers (31.5%).

Candidates
Eleven candidates contested the by-election.

The National Party confirmed that it would contest the by-election, with Mark Osborne selected as candidate. National Party board member Grant McCallum also contested National's selection, along with Mita Harris, Matt King, and Karen Rolleston.

Willow-Jean Prime, a Far North District councillor who contested the Northland electorate for the Labour Party at the 2014 election, was again Labour's candidate.

New Zealand First leader Winston Peters contested the by-election. Labour leader Andrew Little opined that Peters, aged 69 at the time of the election, would be too old for many voters to select as their new electorate MP. This was rejected by 85% of respondents to a 3 News and Reid Research poll. The Prime Minister, John Key, stated that Peters had "zero chance" in the National Party stronghold, but softened his stance within days when the first opinion polls came out that had Peters at 35%, whilst Osborne sat at 30%.

Reuben Porter was the Mana Movement candidate.

Robin Grieve was the ACT candidate. Joe Carr contested the election for Focus New Zealand while Maki Herbert represented the Aotearoa Legalise Cannabis Party and Rob Painting the Climate Party.

Adam Holland, Adrian Bonner and Bruce Rogan were independent candidates. Holland had previously stood in the 2013 Christchurch East by-election, the 2013 Ikaroa-Rawhiti by-election and in Epsom at the 2014 general election.

Opinion polling

Results

References

2015 elections in New Zealand
Northland 2015
March 2015 events in New Zealand
Politics of the Northland Region